Newbo Abbey was a Premonstratensian house of canons regular in Lincolnshire, England, dedicated to the Assumption of Mary.

In the Middle Ages, Lincolnshire was one of the most densely populated parts of England. Within the historical county there were no less than nine  Premonstratensian houses. Other than Newbo Abbey, these were:  Barlings Abbey, Cammeringham Priory, Hagnaby Abbey,  Newsham Abbey, Orford Priory (women), Stixwould Priory, Tupholme Abbey and  West Ravendale Priory.

Pogrom

Newbo was founded in about 1198 very close to Sedgebrook by Richard de Malebisse or Malbis (died 1209). Malbis, as one of the judges itinerant of York and heavily in debt to a Jewish banker, had instigated in 1190 a pogrom against the Jews of the city, which may have cost as many as 500 lives. (See the History section of York Castle and the page of Yom Tov of Joigny, an eminent rabbi who was among the victims.)

Decline
"In 1401, the monastery was almost depopulated by the results of pestilence and poverty. A licence had to be granted to the abbot in this year to admit twelve canons regular of the order, priests or in minor orders, who should be willing to transfer themselves to Newbo for their lifetime, or until more novices should come to the house. There was evidently some difficulty in finding enough to fill up the vacant places; for about the same time a further licence was granted to the abbot to dispense twelve secular persons from any kind of defect of birth, and to promote them to holy orders; they might hold benefices or any ecclesiastical dignities. The indulgence of the Portiuncula was granted at the same time to penitents visiting the conventual church and contributing to its repair.  No doubt some time passed before the abbey recovered its numbers and prosperity; but by the end of the century all seems to have been fairly well."

Suppression
Newbo was suppressed at Michaelmas 1536 during the Dissolution of the Monasteries by Henry VIII. He  gave a lease to the courtier Margery Lyster.

Stone coffins were dug up in the area of the abbey in about 1920 by the then Duke of Rutland and are believed to be at present in Belvoir Castle, which is only about four miles from the site.

Abbots of Newbo
Ralf, occurs 1227
Matthew, occurs 1242
William, elected 1276, occurs 1310
Ralf, occurs 1401
Simon of Mumby, elected 1406
John, elected 1412
William Gresley, occurs 1433
William Bottesford, elected 1436
Peter York, occurs 1475 to 1478
John Mownckton, occurs 1482 to 1491
John Colby, occurs 1494 to 1500
William Broil, occurs 1522
Richard Carre, last abbot, occurs 1529

References

See also
English Heritage

Monasteries in Lincolnshire
Monasteries dissolved under the English Reformation
Archaeological sites in Lincolnshire